The 1971 All-Ireland Minor Football Championship was the 40th staging of the All-Ireland Minor Football Championship, the Gaelic Athletic Association's premier inter-county Gaelic football tournament for boys under the age of 18.

Galway entered the championship as defending champions, however, they were defeated by Mayo on a scoreline of 1-7 to 0-9 in the Connacht semi-final.

On 26 September 1971, Mayo won the championship following a 2-15 to 2-7 defeat of Cork in the All-Ireland final. This was their fourth All-Ireland title overall and their first title in five championship seasons.

Results

Connacht Minor Football Championship

Quarter-Final

4th July at Carrick-on-Shannon Mayo 5-18 Leitrim 0-2.

Semi-Finals

4th July at Roscommon Roscommon 2-10 Sligo 0-10.

11th July at Castlebar Mayo 1-7 Galway 0-9.

Final

25th July at Castlebar Mayo 2-12 Roscommon 1-8.

Munster Minor Football Championship

Leinster Minor Football Championship

Ulster Minor Football Championship

All-Ireland Minor Football Championship

Semi-Finals

8th August Mayo 3-8 Tyrone 0-13 Croke Park

Final

References

1971
All-Ireland Minor Football Championship